John Graham Bavin (15 August 1917 – 14 May 1972) was an Australian rules footballer who played with Carlton in the Victorian Football League (VFL).

Notes

External links 

Jack Bavin's profile at Blueseum

1917 births
1972 deaths
Carlton Football Club players
Australian rules footballers from South Australia